The 79th Flying Training Wing was a unit of the United States Army Air Forces.  It was last assigned to the Eastern Flying Training Command, and was disbanded on 16 June 1946 at Midland Army Airfield, Texas.

It has no lineage link with the United States Air Force 79th Medical Wing, established on 13 January 1942 as the 79th Pursuit Group (Interceptor) at Dale Mabry Army Airfield, Florida.

History
As a gunnery training wing, both enlisted flexible gunnery schools for bomber-crew defensive gunners, and pilot-training, fixed-gunnery schools were included.  After graduation, air cadets were commissioned as second lieutenants, received their "wings", and were reassigned to operational or replacement training units operated by one of the four numbered air forces in the zone of interior.

Lineage
 Established as 79th Flying Training Wing on 14 August 1943
 Activated on 25 August 1943
 Disbanded on 30 December 1945

Assignments
 Army Air Forces Central Flying Training Command, 25 August 1943
 Army Air Forces Eastern Flying Training Command, 15 October-30 December 1945

Training aircraft
The schools of the wing used Beechcraft AT-11 and Lockheed AT-18s for airborne gunnery trainers.   Trainee gunners fired at modified AT-6s and Bell RP-39Qs with nonpiercing ammunition that would break apart on contact. Also, older, noncombat-suitable B-24 Liberators and B-17 Flying Fortresses were used in the latter part of training.

Fixed gunnery training at Matagorda Island used North American AT-6s to attack fixed targets on the range with machine guns and concrete practice bombs.

Assigned schools

 Harlingen Army Airfield, Harlingen, Texas
 AAF Gunnery School (Flexible)
 93d Flexible Gunnery Training Group
 Opened: January 1942, closed: February 1946 (AT-6, AT-11, AT-18, B-24, RP-39Q)
 Used modified AT-6s (later RP-39Qs) as air gunnery targets; closed February 1946; reopened as Harlingen Air Force Base, 1950; closed 1962
 Laredo Army Airfield, Laredo, Texas
 AAF Gunnery School (Flexible)
 2d Aerial Gunnery Training Group
 Opened: April 1942, Closed: November 1945 (AT-6, AT-11, AT-18, B-17, B-24, RP-39Q)
 Used modified AT-6s (later RP-39Qs) as air gunnery targets; closed November 1945; reopened as Laredo Air Force Base, 1950; closed 1974

 Matagorda Island General Bombing and Gunnery Range, Matagorda Island, Texas
 AAF Gunnery School (Fixed)
 62d Single Engine Flying Training Group (856th, 857th, 858th, 859th) Single-Engine Gunnery Squadrons
 Opened: June 1942, Closed: April 1945 (AT-6)
 Also known as Matagorda Peninsula Army Airfield; Sub-Field of Foster Field, Texas

Stations
 Harlingen Army Airfield, Texas, 25 August 1943
 Maxwell Field, Alabama, 15 October–30 December 1945

References

Training wings of the United States Army Air Forces
Military units and formations established in 1943
Military units and formations disestablished in 1945
1943 establishments in Texas
1945 disestablishments in Alabama